Noordkaap were a Belgian rock band, led by singer Stijn Meuris. Their best-known songs include "Ik Hou Van U" and "Satelliet S.U.Z.Y."

History
Noordkaap was founded in 1990 by Stijn Meuris, Lars Van Bambost, Erik Sterckx, Wim De Wilde, and Nico Van Calster. The band won Humo's Rock Rally in the same year.

The band released their debut album, Feest in de stad, in late 1991. In 1994, under a new record label, they released Gigant.

A year later Noordkaap made the soundtrack for the feature film Manneken Pis. The single "Ik hou van u" appeared in the charts for several weeks, and was re-released in a mix of French and Dutch to mark Belgium's 175th anniversary in 2005.

After releasing the soundtrack for Alles moet weg in 1996, several members left the group, leaving only Meuris and Van Bambost. The band returned in 1999 with new members Mario Goossens, Anton Janssens and Wladimir Geels, and the album Massis.

On 1 April 2000, Noordkaap played their final concert in the Ancienne Belgique in Brussels. Lars Van Bambost joined Novastar, and Stijn Meuris started a new band called Monza.

Members
 Stijn Meuris (singer)
 Lars Van Bambost (guitar)
 Erik Sterckx (bass)
 Wim De Wilde (keyboard)
 Nico Van Calster (drums)
 Mario Goossens
 Anton Janssens
 Wladimir Geels
 Alain Thijs
 Stefan Vanduffel

Discography 
 Feest in de stad, 1991
 Een heel klein beetje oorlog..., 1993
 Gigant, 1994
 Manneken Pis, 1995, soundtrack
 Programma '96, 1996
 Alles moet weg, 1996, soundtrack
 Massis, 1999
 Avanti!, 1999, compilation

References

External links 
Official site

Belgian rock music groups